Erhan Yaylacı is a Turkish freestyle wrestler competing in the 92 kg division. He is a member of İstanbul Büyükşehir Belediyesi S.K.

Career 

In 2020, he won the bronze medal in the men's 92 kg event at the 2020 Individual Wrestling World Cup held in Belgrade, Serbia.

In 2021, he won the gold medal in the men's 92 kg event at the 2021 European U23 Wrestling Championship held in Skopje, North Macedonia.

In 2022, he won the bronze medal in his event at the Matteo Pellicone Ranking Series 2022 held in Rome, Italy. He won the silver medal in the men's 92 kg event at the 2021 Islamic Solidarity Games held in Konya, Turkey.

Achievements

References

External links
 

1998 births
Living people
Turkish male sport wrestlers
Islamic Solidarity Games competitors for Turkey
Islamic Solidarity Games medalists in wrestling
21st-century Turkish people